Star News Group is a media company based in Pakenham, Victoria, in Australia.

Star publishes many community newspapers in the Melbourne area and other parts of Victoria. It also has publications in Queensland and South Australia. Star also publishes a number of parenting magazines under the masthead Kids Today.

Star operates Network Classifieds Pty Ltd, a contact centre in Pakenham that provides classified advertising and display advertising services for print and online. Star is also a founder and partner of the Today News Group with operations in Queensland and South Australia.

History 
Star News Group was founded by Albert Edward Thomas in 1909 as the Berwick Shire News and Pakenham and Cranbourne Gazette. Star News is still owned by the Thomas family and the company is managed by Paul Thomas, a fourth-generation family member.

The company changed its name from South East Newspapers to Star News Group in August 2005 to reflect the growth of the company and the diversity of regions that the company covers. In December 2022, it agreed terms to purchase 14 publications from Australian Community Media.

Description 
Star News Group's community newspapers have a combined circulation of more than 500,000 copies per week. In addition, Star produces a number of niche education, wedding, tourism, real estate, kids, seniors and lifestyle magazines titles.

Victoria publications 
In Melbourne's South East the company produce the following newspaper titles; Pakenham Gazette, Berwick Gazette, Pakenham Officer Star News, Berwick Star News, Cranbourne Star News, Dandenong Star Journal, Endeavour Hills Hallam Doveton Star Journal and online provide Star Community.  Star also owns and operates Star Weekly titles in Melbourne's West as MMP Star Pty Ltd and they include; Brimbank & Northwest Star Weekly, Maribyrnong & Hobsons Bay Star Weekly, Melton & Moorabool Star Weekly, Northern Star Weekly, Sunbury & Macedon, Ranges Star Weekly, and Wyndham Star Weekly.

In Healesville, in the Yarra Valley and the Dandenong Ranges of Victoria, Star publishes the Ferntree Gully Belgrave Star Mail, Mount Evelyn Star Mail, Mountain Views Star Mail, Ranges Trader Star Mail, Upper Yarra Star Mail as well as the region's web site Star Mail Community.

In the Greater Geelong region, Star produces newspapers the Geelong Independent and Ocean Grove Voice as well as Geelong Coast Magazine.

Queensland publications 
Star publishes Warwick Today, Stanthorpe Today and in Noosa Noosa Today.  The company is also involved in publishing CQ Today, Gladstone Today, Bundaberg Today, Gympie Today, South Burnett Today, Central & North Burnett Today, Maranoa Today, Ipswich News Today, Longreach Leader and Central West Leader. 
 South Australian publications 
Star is also involved in publishing the Border Watch, South Eastern Times and Penola Pennant on the Limestone Coast in South Australia. These publications closed in August 2020 during the COVID19 pandemic. The Border Watch was relaunched in November 2020 and the Penola Pennant and South Eastern Times in March 2022.

 Children's publications 
Kids Today magazines include; Bayside Glen Eira Kids Today, Casey Cardinia Kids Today, Stonnington Boroondara Kids Today, Geelong Coast Kids Today, Sunshine Coast Kids Today, Knox Monash Kids Today, and Yarra Ranges Kids Today -  Education titles include Victoria School Guides''.

External links
Star News Group corporate site
Star Community
Mail Community

References

Companies based in Melbourne
Newspaper companies of Australia
Australian companies established in 1909
Publishing companies established in 1909